Marius Myhre Fartum (born 21 November 1991) is a Norwegian badminton player. He is affiliated with Haugerud IF and has won nine Norwegian National Championships title, seven consecutive men's singles title from 2013–2019, 1 in the mixed and men's doubles respectively. Myhre won his first senior international title at the 2015 Norwegian International.

Career 
Myhre started practicing badminton at the age of ten, introduced and trained by his father, Rune Fartum, who also played badminton. He plays in the men's singles. He participated in the 2013, 2015 and 2017 BWF World Championships. He won his first international title at the home soil 2015 Norwegian International tournament, a feat no home player has achieved since Jim Ronny Andersen in 2000.

Myhre now works as a coach in Haugerud IF.

Achievements

BWF International Challenge/Series 
Men's singles

  BWF International Challenge tournament
  BWF International Series tournament
  BWF Future Series tournament

References

External links 
 

1991 births
Living people
People from Lørenskog
Norwegian male badminton players
Badminton coaches
Sportspeople from Viken (county)